Safford (Western Apache: Ichʼįʼ Nahiłtį́į́) is a city in Graham County, Arizona, United States. According to the 2020 Census, the population of the city is 10,129. The city is the county seat of Graham County.

Safford is the principal city of the Safford Micropolitan Statistical Area, which includes all of Graham County.

Geography
Safford is located at  (32.823266, -109.714613). The Pinaleno Mountains sit prominently to the southwest of town. The Pinalenos have the greatest vertical relief of any mountain range in Arizona.

Demographics

The racial makeup of the city was 67.7% White, 1.1% Black or African American, 2.3% Native American, 0.8% Asian, 0.08% Pacific Islander, 17.4% from other races, and 17.4% from two or more races, 0.5% from three or more races, and 0.05% from four or five races. Hispanic or Latino of any race were 42.9% of the population.

According to the 2019 American Community Survey, There were 3,313 households, out of which 31.9% had children under the age of 18 living with them, 39.8% were married couples living together, 17.9% had a female householder with no male present, 6.9% had a male householder with no female present, and 35.3% were non-families. 27.7% of all households were made up of individuals, and 12.7% of these households had someone living alone who was 65 years of age or older. The average household size was 2.85 and the average family size was 3.55. 

With a total of 4102 housing units in the city, 63.4% of homes were owner occupied and 36.6% were renter occupied. 

The population consisted of 50.6% males and 49.4% females with the average age being 32.1. 28.4% of the population was under the age of 18 and 71.6% over the age of 18. Further breakdown shows 22.9% of the population being 14 and under, 8.3% being 15-19, 8.9% being 20-24, 13.6% being 25-34, 10.5% being 35-44, 12.3% being 45-54, 8.9% being 55-64, and 14.7% being 65 and over. 84.3% of households speak English alone while 15.4% primarily speak Spanish and 0.3% speak another language.

For those aged 18-24 years, 20.6% have completed less than high school, 29.5% have completed high school or equivalency, 42.5% have some college or an associates degree, and 7.5% hold a bachelors degree. For those aged 25 and over, 3.3% completed less than 9th grade, 9.3% completed 9-12th grade with no diploma, 22.5% completed high school, 38.7% have completed some college, 9.2% hold an associates degree, 12.4% hold a bachelors degree, and 4.6% hold a graduate or professional degree. 15.5% of males aged 25 and over hold some kind of college degree while 27.6% of females 25 and over hold a college degree. 

Of the population aged 16 or over, 61.7% are in the labor force and 5.9% of the 18 and over population are veterans. The average household income was $57,904 while the median household income was $50,255. 27.7% of those under 18, 17.9% of those aged 18-64, and 16.9% of those aged 65 and over live beneath the poverty line. In 2017, the poverty line for a single person in the United States was an income of less than $12,060 per year

Climate
The climate is cold semi-arid (Köppen: BSk) softened by the plateau rise (it receives enough rainfall not to fall into a cold desert, BWk).

Religion
Monastery of St. Paisius, Safford is an Orthodox women's cenobitic community which follows the traditional rule of monastic life. The monastery, under the jurisdiction of the Russian Orthodox Church Outside of Russia (ROCOR)- Western Diocese is situated in the high Sonoran Desert at the base of Mount Graham.

History
Safford was founded by Joshua Eaton Bailey, Hiram Kennedy, and Edward Tuttle, who came from Gila Bend, in southwestern Arizona. They left Gila Bend in the winter of 1873-74 because their work on canals and dams had been destroyed by high water the previous summer. Upon arrival early in 1874, the villagers laid out the town site, including a few crude buildings.

The town is named after Arizona Territorial Governor Anson P. K. Safford.

The Town of Safford was incorporated October 10, 1901, and changed to City of Safford in 1955.

Economy
The city's largest employers are Freeport-McMoRan Copper and Gold, Safford Unified Schools, DRG Technologies Inc, Bowman Consulting Group, Open Loop Energy and Walmart. Recently, Freeport-McMoRan opened two mining facilities just north of the city that make up the largest new mining operation in North America. Arizona State Prison Complex - Safford also employs many residents, as does the Federal Correctional Institution, Safford. Agriculture is considered to be a major economic activity, with cotton fields and a gin located in the city.
A billboard along US Highway 70 announces "Safford .... Copper, Cattle & Cotton".

Transportation
The community is served by a freight rail line, the Arizona Eastern Railway, and hosts an air facility, Safford Regional Airport.  Additionally the Arizona Department of Transportation is upgrading U.S. Route 191 from Interstate 10 into a full four-lane highway. ADOT is considering putting a U.S. Route 70 loop south of the city that would run from Swift Trail Junction to Thatcher.

San Carlos Apache Nnee Bich'o Nii Transit provides transportation from Safford to the San Carlos Apache Indian Reservation and Globe.
Greyhound Lines serves Safford on its Phoenix-El Paso via Globe route with a stop in Thatcher.

Education
The Safford Unified School District serves the entire city of Safford and some minor outlying areas. The nearby Eastern Arizona College provides higher education services, and a University of Arizona agricultural extension is located to the east of the city.

Legislation has been suggested in state committee to transform the nearby Eastern Arizona College from its present status as a two-year community college into a full four-year educational institution.

Safford is also home to the Eastern Arizona College's Discovery Park Campus, a unique public educational destination facility that provides tours of the world-class telescopes at the Mt. Graham International Observatory, a public access observatory with a research grade 20" Cassagrain telescope, the World's largest permanent mount "Camera Obscura", a full motion Shuttle simulator that takes you on an exciting ride through the Milky Way galaxy, and galleries of historical artifacts from Graham County and the "History of Astronomy" Gallery, as well as a beautifully restored Sonoran riparian area featuring a one-acre ecology education pond and over four miles of trials that take you through the habitat of native and migratory birds, reptiles, and mammals.

The Safford City-Graham County Library provides citizens of Safford with books, computers, free classes, childhood literacy programs and entertainment. It serves 13,625 total citizens between Graham, Greenlee and Gila counties.

Public safety
The city of Safford is served by the Safford Police Department, headed by Chief Glen Orr. Additional law enforcement services are provided by the Graham County Sheriff's Office.

Fire protection is provided by the Safford Volunteer Fire Department. The department was organized May 20, 1907, with a Fire Chief and 12 other town volunteers. Today, Safford's volunteer Fire Department consists of a Fire Chief and 31 other volunteer firefighters. The department responds to more than 200 calls per year. The department services the city's  as well as encompassing an area of  outside the city.

Observatories
Due to Safford's relatively isolated dark sky location, the area has been chosen as a prime spot for hosting observatories. Safford and Thatcher's street lights are low-output to improve the quality of the images taken by the observatories atop the mountain to the southwest of the city. The mountain for which the county is named, Mount Graham, is just a few miles southwest of the city. The mountain is home to the Mount Graham International Observatory (MGIO) and Large Binocular Telescope, or LBT. It, when completed, will be the largest binocular telescope in the world. The mountain also is home to the Vatican Advanced Technology Telescope, or VATT. It is also home to the Heinrich Hertz Submillimeter Telescope, or SMT. The Mount Graham International Observatory complex is operated by the University of Arizona.

Notable people
 D. J. Carrasco, MLB pitcher
 Michael Ensign, actor
 Justin Gaethje, mixed martial artist, former World Series of Fighting Lightweight Champion, former interim UFC Lightweight Champion
 Matthew Lopez, UFC mixed martial artist
 Carol Lee MacDonald, state legislator in 1987
 Fred Mortensen, former NFL quarterback for the Denver Broncos and Washington Redskins
 Dale Smith, team roping world champion, Rodeo Hall of Famer

In popular culture
Safford is one of the settings for the 1985 Albert Brooks comedy Lost in America. Safford is also the setting for the Jim W. Coleman book Omens.

References

 Hayden, Carl T., & Arizona State University (1997). Hayden Arizona Pioneer Biographies Collection. Tempe, Ariz.: Arizona Collection, Dept. of Archives and Manuscripts, Arizona State University Libraries. Biography of Joshua Eaton Bailey. .
 McClintock, James H. (1985). Mormon Settlement in Arizona. Tucson, Ariz.: University of Arizona Press.  .

External links

Safford City Government
Graham County Chamber of Commerce
Eastern Arizona College

 
Cities in Arizona
County seats in Arizona
Populated places established in 1874
Cities in Graham County, Arizona
Safford, Arizona micropolitan area
1874 establishments in Arizona Territory